Hermenegildo Candeias (17 April 1934 – 10 January 2023) was a Portuguese gymnast. He competed in six events at the 1960 Summer Olympics.

Candeias died on 10 January 2023, at the age of 88.

References

External links
 

1934 births
2023 deaths
Portuguese male artistic gymnasts
Olympic gymnasts of Portugal
Gymnasts at the 1960 Summer Olympics
People from Oeiras, Portugal
Sportspeople from Lisbon District
20th-century Portuguese people
21st-century Portuguese people